Sava Kovačević (1905–1943) was a Yugoslav Partisan World War II commander.

Sava Kovačević may also refer to:
Sava Kovačević (Zemun), an urban neighborhood of Belgrade, capital of Serbia, in the municipality of Zemun
Blok Sava Kovačević, an urban neighborhood of Belgrade, capital of Serbia, in the municipality of Palilula